Elachista fasciola is a moth of the family Elachistidae. It is found from Europe (Latvia, Poland, the Czech Republic, Hungary, Slovakia, Italy) east through Russia to Japan.

The larvae feed on Achnatherum pekinense, Brachypodium sylvaticum, Calamagrostis arundinacea and Elymus repens. They mine the leaves of their host plant.

References

fasciola
Moths described in 1983
Moths of Europe
Moths of Asia